Rockville Historic District is a national historic district located at Rockville, Charleston County, South Carolina. The district encompasses 19 contributing buildings in the town of Rockville.  The dwellings reflect Rockville's historic role as a summer resort town.  The houses are characterized by spacious porches, raised foundations, and large central hallways designed for summer comfort and relaxation.  Located in the district are the Grace Episcopal Church and Wadmalaw Presbyterian Church.

It was listed on the National Register of Historic Places in 1972.

References

Historic districts on the National Register of Historic Places in South Carolina
Buildings and structures in Charleston County, South Carolina
National Register of Historic Places in Charleston County, South Carolina